Shotts railway station is a railway station serving Shotts in North Lanarkshire, Scotland. It is located on the Shotts Line, 20½ miles (33 km) east of  towards .  It was opened by the Caledonian Railway in 1869 as one of the principal stations on their Cleland and Midcalder Line.

Shotts station is the last stop in the SPT area boundary before the train enters West Lothian.  There is a large car park in part of the former goods yard.

Services 
Monday to Saturdays, there is generally a twice-hourly service westbound to Glasgow Central (normally 15 minutes past and half past the hour) and eastbound to Edinburgh Waverley (normally half past and 55 minutes past the hour). One of these is a semi-fast service serving , Livingston South, West Calder and Haymarket only, whilst the other stops at all intermediate stations except Cambuslang (limited service) and Breich (which has only one call each way per weekday).

Since 9 December 2012 there has been a new two-hourly Sunday service between Glasgow Central and Edinburgh Waverley.

References

Sources

External links
Video of Shotts railway station

SPT railway stations
Railway stations in North Lanarkshire
Railway stations served by ScotRail
Railway stations in Great Britain opened in 1869
Former Caledonian Railway stations
1869 establishments in Scotland
Shotts